Fire Garden is the fourth studio album by guitarist Steve Vai, released on September 17, 1996 through Epic Records. The album reached No. 106 on the U.S. Billboard 200 and remained on that chart for two weeks, as well as reaching the top 100 in three other countries.

Overview
As described by Vai in the liner notes, Fire Garden is a concept album divided into two "phases": "Phase 1" comprises tracks 1–9 and is entirely instrumental (with the exception of Devin Townsend's backwards vocals on "Whookam" and some more vocals toward the end of "Fire Garden Suite"), while "Phase 2", the remainder of the album, features Vai on vocals on every song except the instrumental "Warm Regards". Fire Garden was intended to be a double album, but during mastering Vai heard about the new 80-minute CD format (instead of 74 for a standard CD), which meant that both sides were able to fit onto a single disc.

"Dyin' Day" was co-written by Ozzy Osbourne during the writing sessions for Osbourne's 1995 album Ozzmosis. Another song from those sessions, "My Little Man", made its way onto Ozzmosis and is credited on that album as being co-written by Vai.

Critical reception

Stephen Thomas Erlewine at AllMusic gave Fire Garden four stars out of five, calling it "An impressive effort from a musician who continues to grow and stretch himself with each new release" and "enjoyable for non-guitar freaks, as well." He said that Vai's vocals "still have a way to go before they are as expressive as his instrumental work, but this subtle and dense concept album is the closest he's ever gotten to integrating the two sides of his musical personality together."

Track listing

Personnel

Steve Vai – lead vocals, guitar, all other instrumentation (except where noted), arrangement, engineering, production
Devin Townsend – lead vocals (tracks 4, 9)
Will Riley – keyboard (track 14)
John Avila – bass (track 2)
Stuart Hamm – bass (track 3)
Fabrizio Gossi – bass (track 14)
Chris Frazier – drums (track 1)
Greg Bissonette – drums (track 2) 
Deen Castronovo – drums (tracks 3, 5, 7, 11, 12, 15)
Mike Mangini – drums (tracks 8, 9)
Robin DiMaggio – drums (track 14)
C.C. White – background vocals (tracks 12, 17)
Tracee Lewis – background vocals (tracks 12, 17)
Miroslava Mendoza Escriba – background vocals (tracks 12, 17)
Kimberly Evans – background vocals (tracks 12, 17)
John Sombrotto – background vocals (track 17)
Mark McCrite – background vocals (track 17)
Jim Altan – background vocals (track 17)
Julian Vai – spoken vocals – track (18)
Marcelo Gomes – engineering assistance
Sergio Buss – engineering assistance
T. J. Helmerich – engineering assistance (track 17)
Bernie Grundman – mastering

Chart performance

References

External links
In Review: Steve Vai "Fire Garden" at Guitar Nine Records

Steve Vai albums
1996 albums
Epic Records albums
Concept albums